Shaoli Mitra [alternatively spelt as Shaonli Mitra;  1948 – 16 January 2022) was an Indian Bengali theatre and film actress, director, and playwright. She played the role of Bangabala in Ritwik Ghatak's Jukti Takko Aar Gappo. She is the daughter of Sombhu Mitra and Tripti Mitra, who were also theatre personalities.

Career
Mitra was involved in drama from her childhood under the guidance of her parents Sombhu Mitra and Tripti Mitra. She acted in the play Dakghar in the role of Amal. Later she also formed her own theatre group. In 2011, she became the chairperson of Rabindra Shardhoshato Janmabarsha Udjapon Samiti. She worked with the Bohurupee productions. She also established the theatre group "Pancham Baidik" which is pioneer for producing widely acclaimed plays on women's emancipation.

Personal life and death
Mitra married to bahurupi's Kaliprasad Ghosh in July 1977. Mitra died of heart ailments on 16  January 2022 at the age of 73 at her home in South Kolkata.

Films
Jukti Takko Aar Gappo (Character name Bongobala)

Plays
Bitata Bitangsha
Nathabati Anathabat
Putulkhela
Ekti Rajnaitik Hotya 
Hajabaralo
Katha Amritasaman
Lankadahan
Chandali
Pagla ghorha
Pakhi
Galileo r Jeeban
Daakghar
Jodi Aar ek Baar
As Sita in Sitakatha

Books
Five Lords, Yet None a Protector & Words Sweet & Timeless
Gononatya, Nobonatya, Sotnatya O Sombhu Mitra

Awards
 Sangeet Natak Akademi Award in 2003 for acting in Bengali theatre
 Banga Bibhushan in 2012 for lifetime achievement in theatre
 Padma Shri in 2009 in Arts.

References

External links
 

1940s births
2022 deaths
Date of birth missing
20th-century Indian actresses
21st-century Indian actresses
Actresses in Bengali cinema
Bengali actresses
Bengali theatre personalities
Indian film actresses
Indian stage actresses
Recipients of the Padma Shri in arts
Recipients of the Sangeet Natak Akademi Award